John Chris Inglis (born October 29, 1954), also known as Chris Inglis, is an American government official who served as the first National Cyber Director. Inglis is also a former Deputy Director of the National Security Agency. On April 12, 2021 President Joe Biden nominated Inglis to serve as the first National Cyber Director. His nomination was confirmed by the Senate by voice vote on June 17, 2021. He was sworn into office on July 11, 2021. He resigned from the position on February 15, 2023.

Early life and education
Inglis was born in Baltimore, Maryland on 29 October 1954.  He graduated from Andover High School, Linthicum in 1972.  Inglis is a Distinguished Eagle Scout.

After high school, Inglis attended the United States Air Force Academy, graduating in 1976 as a Distinguished Graduate with a Bachelor of Science Degree in Engineering Mechanics.
1996 – Graduate of Air War College, USAF Squadron Officers School, Air Command and Staff College
1990 – Graduated George Washington University, Professional Degree Computer Science
1984 – Graduated Johns Hopkins University, M.S. in Computer Science
1977 – Graduated Columbia University, M.S. in Mechanical Engineering

Inglis' training includes undergraduate and Instructor Pilot Training, and he also attended the Air War College where he was designated Outstanding Graduate.

Career

Assignments
 2015–     – Robert and Mary M. Looker Professor in Cyber Security Studies, United States Naval Academy
 2006–2014 – Deputy Director of the National Security Agency
 2003–2006 – Special United States Liaison Officer – London
 2001–2003 – Signals Intelligence Deputy Director for Analysis and Production
 1999–2001 – Chief, Office of China and Korea, Operations Directorate
 1998–1999 – Deputy Chief, Office of China and Korea, Operations Directorate
 1997 – Promoted to the Senior Executive Service
 1996–1997 – Senior Operations Officer, National Security Operations Center
 1995–1996 – Deputy Chief, NSA Office of Encryption Policy
 1992–1995 – Participant in Senior Cryptologic Executive Development Program Management and staff tours in the Directorates of Operations, Information Systems Security and Plans and Programs.
 1991–1992 – Visiting Professor, Department of Electrical Engineering and Computer Science, U.S. Military Academy, West Point, NY
 1986–1991 – Information Security Analyst and Manager up through division level within NSA's Information Systems Security Directorate.
 1983–1986 – Mechanical Engineering professor at US Naval Academy

Significant awards
 2014 – President's National Security Medal
 2014 – Director of National Intelligence Distinguished Service Medal
 2009 – Presidential Rank Award for Distinguished Service
 2006 – U.S. Air Force Distinguished Service Medal
 2004 – Presidential Rank Award for Distinguished Service
 2002 – Exceptional Civilian Service Award

 2000 – Presidential Rank Award for Meritorious Service

 1992 – Department of the Army – Outstanding Civilian Service Award

External assignments
 1985–2006 – Brigadier General in the Air National Guard and qualified as a command pilot. Has commanded at Flight, Squadron, Group and Joint Force Headquarters.
 1976–1985 – U.S. Air Force officer and pilot. Inglis served as a Brigadier General in the Air National Guard and was qualified as a command pilot in the C-130J and served as the commander 135th Airlift Group – the first USAF unit equipped with the C-130J.

Before his approval to become National Cyber Director, Inglis worked for WestExec Advisors. A 2021 investigation by The American Prospect found that Inglis "earned $15,000 from the firm and worked for internet security outfit CrowdStrike and email encryption company Virtru."

References

External links

 Maryland Air National Guard – Bio
 Official Bio on NSA web site
 

1954 births
Living people
George Washington University alumni
United States Air Force Academy alumni
Columbia School of Engineering and Applied Science alumni
National Security Agency people
Deputy Directors of the National Security Agency
United States Air Force generals
People from Linthicum, Maryland
Military personnel from Baltimore
Presidential Rank Award recipients